Martina Hingis and Sania Mirza were the defending champions, but lost in the second round to Vania King and Alla Kudryavtseva.
Bethanie Mattek-Sands and Coco Vandeweghe won the title, defeating Julia Görges and Karolína Plíšková in the final, 4–6, 6–4, [10–6].

Seeds

Draw

Finals

Top half

Bottom half

References
 Main Draw

BNP Paribas Open – Women's Doubles
2016 BNP Paribas Open